Washington Luigi Garcia (born November 14, 1978), known as Washington, is a former Brazilian football player.

Career
Born in Sao Paulo, Washington began playing professional football as a striker with Sao Paulo FC. He embarked on a journeyman's career, with stints in Japan, Belgium, Russia and Mexico.

Club statistics

References

External links

library.footballjapan.jp 

 

1978 births
Living people
Brazilian footballers
Brazilian expatriate footballers
J2 League players
Liga MX players
R.W.D. Molenbeek players
FC Volgar Astrakhan players
Indios de Ciudad Juárez footballers
Associação Atlética Ponte Preta players
Sociedade Esportiva do Gama players
Goiás Esporte Clube players
Montedio Yamagata players
Expatriate footballers in Russia
Expatriate footballers in Belgium
Expatriate footballers in Mexico
Expatriate footballers in Japan
Association football forwards
Footballers from São Paulo